Melvin Bachelet (born 23 May 2003) is a French professional football player who plays for Le Havre II.

Club career 
Melvin Bachelet is a graduate of the Le Havre AC academy, where he was one of the most highly regarded U17.

He made his professional debut for Le Havre on the 15 May 2021, during the Ligue 2 3-2 home win against the league champions of  ESTAC Troyes, debuting the game as a left-back.

References

External links

2003 births
Footballers from Le Havre
Living people
French footballers
Association football defenders
Le Havre AC players
Ligue 2 players
Championnat National 3 players